The Pieve di San Gaudenzio is a Roman Catholic church, located in Ostiano in the province of Cremona, region of Lombardy, Italy.

History
This church was erected in 1580, atop the site of a prior structure, under the patronage of Vespasiano Gonzaga. It was previously attached to a convent, and survived the suppression of orders as the church for an adjacent cemetery. The interior houses the wooden music and organ loft once in the town parish church of San Michele Arcangelo. The structure is in dire need of restoration.

References

Churches in the province of Cremona
16th-century Roman Catholic church buildings in Italy
Roman Catholic churches completed in 1580